Conflict (French: Conflit) is a 1938 French drama film directed by Léonide Moguy, who co-wrote the screenplay with Hans Wilhelm and Charles Gombault (dialogue), based on the novel Die Schwestern Kleh by Gina Kaus. It stars Corinne Luchaire, Annie Ducaux, Marguerite Pierry and Armand Bernard.

The film's sets were designed by the art directors Maurice Colasson and Georges Wakhévitch.

Plot summary

Cast
 Corinne Luchaire as Claire
 Annie Ducaux as Catherine Lafont  
 Claude Dauphin as Gérard   
 Raymond Rouleau as Michel Lafont   
 Armand Bernard as Le greffier / Secretary    
 Roger Duchesne as Robert  
 Marcel Dalio as L'usurier / The Money-Lender  
 Pauline Carton as Pauline 
 Marguerite Pierry as Marguerite Angel

References

Bibliography
 Goble, Alan. The Complete Index to Literary Sources in Film. Walter de Gruyter, 1999.

External links
 
 
 

1938 films
1938 drama films
French drama films
1930s French-language films
Films based on Austrian novels
Films directed by Léonide Moguy
Films produced by Arnold Pressburger
Films scored by Jacques Ibert
French black-and-white films
1930s French films